Bjørn Dahl (born 7 April 1978) is a retired Norwegian footballer from Os, Norway. He has represented the Norway national football team, and he has won the Norwegian Premier League and the Norwegian football cup.

Career
He has played most of his career in Viking FK, but transferred to SK Brann in a trade deal, when Viking bought the central defender Ragnvald Soma from Brann. In addition to Dahl, Brann was paid between £520.000 and £610.000 (€750.000-€880.000).

In 2009, he joined Hønefoss BK, and in 2010, Løv-Ham. He retired after the 2011 season.

Career statistics

Honours

Norway 
Norwegian Premier League: 2007
Norwegian Cup: 2001

References

1978 births
Living people
People from Os, Hordaland
Norwegian footballers
Norway international footballers
Eliteserien players
Viking FK players
SK Brann players
Hønefoss BK players
Løv-Ham Fotball players
Association football defenders
Sportspeople from Vestland